Joaquin Godoy (13 March 1927 – 29 November 2013) was a Cuban rower. He competed in the men's coxed four event at the 1948 Summer Olympics.

References

1927 births
2013 deaths
Cuban male rowers
Olympic rowers of Cuba
Rowers at the 1948 Summer Olympics
Place of birth missing